Lukas Rossi (born December 21, 1976) is a Canadian rock singer and musician. He was the winner of the CBS Television reality series Rock Star: Supernova – a televised audition contest to become lead singer of the hard rock supergroup Rock Star Supernova.

Biography 
Rossi was raised in Toronto, Ontario, Canada. He formed and fronted two bands; the first was Cleavage (1995–2005) with brothers Jon and Bill Jameson. The Toronto-based band won the "Best Canadian Unsigned Band" award at the 2000 NXNE Music Festival in Toronto.

In 2004, Rossi entered into a publishing deal with EMI Music Canada.  After acquiring this deal, Rossi worked with producer Dave Tyson in Los Angeles and later recorded demos with producer Gavin Brown.

In 2005, Rossi partnered with guitarist Dominic Cifarelli and drummer Maxx Zinno along with his longtime friend, Jay Cianfrini, to form a band in Montreal called Rise Electric.

Rossi and two of his colleagues, Mike Fox and Gavin Brown, were winners in the 2006 People's Voice International Songwriting Competition for their song, "Drive". It gained third place honors in the Top 40/Pop category and landed seventh place in the overall competition.

Career

Rock Star: Supernova 
While Rise Electric was on hiatus in the spring of 2006, Rossi competed in Los Angeles, California, on the television show Rock Star: Supernova, as an audition for a new band composed of Tommy Lee (Mötley Crüe), Jason Newsted (Metallica), and Gilby Clarke (Guns N' Roses). His selection as lead singer of Rock Star Supernova earned Rossi a tour of the U.S., Canada, Australia, and New Zealand in early 2007. One of his songs, "Headspin", was included on the band's album which earned platinum status in Canada.

After Rock Star Supernova 
Rossi returned to Los Angeles to begin work on his own solo acoustic act. The Love and Lust EP was released in June 2007. He toured across the U.S. and Canada during the summer, accompanied by keyboard player, Lou Dawson Men Without Hats.

Stars Down 
In 2008, Rossi debuted his next project Stars Down. The band consisted of Rossi (vocals, guitar), German Briseño of Vim Furor (bass, vocals), with occasional appearances by Lou Dawson (keyboards), and guitars and drums with various musicians. The album was originally scheduled to be released in 2009 but Rossi has stated it may never see the light of day due to his own dissatisfaction with its quality. However, in 2011 Lukas released a flash drive that contained his back catalog, including the previously unreleased album "Mood Swings".

Switchblade Glory 
On April 15, 2011, a debut album was released which features Rossi as lead vocals under the band named Switchblade Glory. The album was engineered and co-produced by Andy Johns. Producers are Gary Hoey and Steve Polin. Lyrics and melodies by Rossi. The band features Kenny Aronoff on drums, Steve Polin on guitar, and Josh Esther on bass. On February 26, 2021, Switchblade Glory released a new album titled "Human Toys".

The Halo Method 
In 2012, Rossi teamed up with Evanescence co-founder/lead guitarist Ben Moody to form a new project called The Halo Method. In September 2012, the band released an introductory track, "Beauty is the Beast", for an online interview with Revolver Magazine and performed their debut show aboard the rock and roll cruise, Shiprocked, in November. In 2013, the band released a lyric video of "Toxic" and "Reset", an EP that features four songs: "Toxic", "Beauty Is The Beast", "Porcelain" and "Crutch". The EP was available as a free download at The Halo Method Soundcloud. Later in the year, the band appeared at Rock The River, a benefit festival for Angel on My Shoulder. Following their second appearance on Shiprocked (SR14) in late January 2014, The Examiner described the sound of the band: "The Halo Method rounded out the night on the main deck stage with their hard synth-fused rock show at top notch. The Halo Method features former members of Evanescence, and other well known projects, so these are not novice performers to the live stage. They produce hard rock energy with full emotion in one 'rocking fell swoop'. This band combines it all into one hell of a sound and show: elements of hard rock, goth, alternative metal, industrial, and pop with a great presence from a great band and the voice of Lukas Rossi." The band released a video for "The Last Astronaut" as performed aboard the ship.

Rock cover of "Hello" by Adele 
In November 2015, Rossi released a rock cover of "Hello" by Adele which quickly amassed more than 1 million views upon its debut, and was extremely well received by critics, bloggers, radio, press and fans alike.

King City 
In 2016, Lukas Rossi joined forces with Neil Sanderson of Three Days Grace to form the duo known as King City. Their first single, Neurotic, was released on August 25, 2016.

Stereo Satellite 

Stereo Satellite was formed as a modern rock band with elements of many genres thrown in the mix as a result in each member's diverse musical influences. The band debuted on the 2018 Shiprocked Cruise and shortly after opened for Bon Jovi to a sold out crowd.

Summertime solo album & ANDRO by Tommy Lee 

In July 2020, Rossi released a music video for Summertime that features a litany of cameos as well as his family and friends showing how they are spending their summer.

In October 2020, Rossi was featured on two songs on the album Andro by Tommy Lee, "You Dancy" and a cover of "When You Were Mine" by Prince. Lee also makes an appearance in Rossi's music video for Summertime.

Rossi released the album Autonomic on December 21, 2021.

Discography

Cleavage 
 Cleavage (May 29, 2001)

Rock Star Supernova 
 Rock Star Supernova (November 21, 2006 Burnett Records/Epic Records)

Solo 
 Love and Lust EP (2007)
 So This is Christmas EP (2008)
 The Unreleased Demos (2009)
 The Hope Recordings Live (2009)
 Dark and a Gun EP (2010)
 Hollywood (2010)
 Hollywood Stripped (2010)
 Seed EP (2010)
 The Christmas Collection (2010)
 Story Teller (2011)
 Super Sex Magic (2011)
 Prophecy (2011)
 8 Days (2012)
 Circus Freak Sideshow (2016)
 Naked (2017)
 Summertime (2020)
 Autonomic (2021)

Stars Down 
 Stars Down Exclusive EP (2008)
 Mood Swings Sampler EP (2008)
 Mood Swings (2008)

Switchblade Glory 
 Switchblade Glory (2011)
 Human Toys (2021)

The Halo Method 
 Reset EP (2013)

Singles 
 "Hello" (Adele Cover) (2015)
 "Crawling" (Linkin Park Cover) (2020)
 "I'm Just Human" (2020)
 "Mary, Did You Know?" (Cover) (2020)
 "Rebel Yell" (Cover, with Jonathan Young) (2021)

Cleavage 
 "Riddled" – Cleavage (2001)

Rock Star Supernova 
 "It's All Love" (2006)
 "Be Yourself and 5 Other Cliches" (2006)
 "Headspin" (2007)
 "Can't Bring Myself To Light This Fuse" (2007)

Features

Peter Jackson: Fresh Start 
 "18 To Life" (Skid Row Cover) (2012)

Tommy Lee: ANDRO 
 "You Dancy" (2020)
 "When You Were Mine" (Prince Cover) (2020)

Micah 
 "Upside Down" (2020)

Three Days Grace 
 "Neurotic"  (2022)

Soundtracks

Beyblade V-Force: Let It Rip 
 "Lets Beyblade (Opening Theme)" – Beyblade V-Force: Let It Rip (2004)

Composer 
 "Cold" Single for Geoff Tate/Queensrÿche

Media 
Lukas performed live at the 2006 Gemini awards, appeared on and won the CBS television series Rock Star: Supernova, as well as appearing on The Ellen DeGeneres Show, Live with Regis and Kelly, Jimmy Kimmel Live!, Entertainment Tonight, The Howard Stern Show, and ET Canada. In 2010, Lukas began providing fashion commentary for In Touch weekly entertainment magazine.

Personal life 
Rossi and his wife, Kendra Jade Rossi, were introduced by mutual friends Tommy Lee and Dave Navarro in 2006.  They were married in May 2007. In 2010, Lukas and Kendra moved from LA to Nashville.

In a 2015 interview with ET Canada, Rossi announced that he and his wife had adopted a boy named Bryden.

References

External links 
 Official website

Living people
1976 births
Canadian rock singers
Canadian singer-songwriters
Musicians from Toronto
Canadian people of Italian descent
Rockstar: Supernova contestants
Singing talent show winners
The Voice (franchise) contestants
21st-century Canadian male singers
Canadian male singer-songwriters